The Velocity XL (XL: Extra Large) is an American amateur-built aircraft, produced by Velocity, Inc. It is an enlarged version of their Velocity SE canard pusher design.

Design and development

The Velocity XL is  longer and has a  greater span than the SE.

The XL is available in both fixed gear (FG) and retractable gear (RG) form and can accommodate either three or four passengers plus a pilot.  The five seat versions, the XL-5 and the TXL-RG-5, have a rear bench seat for three rather than the alternative separate pair of seats.

Builders may use these manufacturer kits or design their own engine installations using a variety of other engines of similar power output.

Variants

Velocity XL-FG
Forty had been completed and flown by December 2011.
Velocity XL-FG-5
Twenty-one had been completed and flown by December 2011.
Velocity XL-RG
Velocity TXL-RG-5
Eighteen had been completed and flown by December 2011.
Velocity V-Twin
Twin engine prototype, three built, powered by two Superior IO-320-A engines.

Rocket Racers

The now-defunct Rocket Racing League utilized a highly modified Velocity XL FG airframe and an Armadillo Aerospace 2,500 pound thrust liquid oxygen (LOX) and ethanol rocket engine in both its Mark-II X-Racer and Mark-III X-Racer demonstration vehicles.  The Mark-II utilized a standard fixed-gear Velocity XL airframe, modified for rocket propulsion. The Mark-III airframe was more extensively customized during manufacture, explicitly for rocket racing, with a canopy top, center seat and control stick and other enhancements, in addition to the rocket propulsion added to the Mark-II.

Specifications (XL-RG)

See also
Velocity SE
Freedom Aviation Phoenix
Rutan Long-EZ
Rutan VariEze
Rutan Defiant
Berkut aircraft
Cozy MK IV
Raptor Aircraft Raptor

References

External links

Building Ferrell Velocity N44VF

1990s United States civil utility aircraft
Canard aircraft
Homebuilt aircraft
Single-engined pusher aircraft
Mid-wing aircraft